(sometimes rendered  or ) which translates literally from Latin as 'not twice in the same [thing]', is a legal doctrine to the effect that no legal action can be instituted twice for the same cause of action. It is a legal concept originating in Roman civil law, but it is essentially the equivalent of the double jeopardy doctrine found in common law jurisdictions, and similar peremptory plea ('previously acquitted/convicted') in some modern civil law countries.

The International Covenant on Civil and Political Rights guarantees the right to be free from double jeopardy; however, it does not apply to prosecutions by two different sovereigns (unless the relevant extradition treaty or other agreement between the countries expresses a prohibition).

Rome Statute and  UN tribunals 

The Rome Statute establishing the International Criminal Court (ICC) states that the  principle has a peculiar meaning, especially in comparison to European supranational law. The ICC jurisdiction is complementary to national law, and Article 20 of the Rome Statute specifies that even if the principle remains in general terms, it cannot be taken in consideration if there is unwillingness or incapability of the existence of the supranational court's jurisdiction.

Article 10 of the ICTY Statute and Article 9 of the ICTR Statute both state that the principle can be enforced mainly to clarify that the ad hoc tribunal's sentences are "stronger" than the ones in domestic courts.

In other words, national courts cannot proceed against the responsible parties of crimes within the tribunal's jurisdiction if the international tribunal has already pronounced sentence for the same crimes.  However, the ICTY and the ICTR can judge alleged criminals already sentenced by national courts if both of the following occur:
the sentence defined the crimes as "ordinary".
the judiciary of the state is not considered impartial or the domestic trial is considered to be a pretense to protect the accused from the legal action of international justice or is considered to be unfair on some fundamental legal basis.

European Court of Human Rights – Zolotukhin vs Russia
The European Court of Human Rights ruling in the case Zolotukhin vs Russia has had a noticeable impact on practical law in Europe, where the double-punishment ban applies to all forms.

That decision, on February 10, 2009, was about a military discipline case. The Russian soldier Sergey Zolotukhin took his girlfriend into military property without permission, acted threateningly, and used obscene insulting language toward the police officers who arrested him. Eleven years later, the conflict over and eventual rejection of the soldier's  criminal prosecution after administrative punishment, has had consequences for double punishments throughout Europe.

Especially in tax-fraud cases, the ruling has changed many court cases since 2009. Defendants had sometimes been ordered to pay civil fines to their tax authority for filing incorrect tax declarations, then were later also prosecuted for the same transgressions, being sentenced by a district court for tax crimes.  After the Zolotukhin ruling, such criminal convictions were vacated, with the persons being released (if still then-incarcerated) and compensated for time in prison.

European Court of Justice 
The European Court of Justice has ruled that  only applies in competition law cases when the offender, the facts, and the protected legal interests are the same.

See also
 Extradition
 List of legal Latin terms

Notes

References

Legal rules with Latin names
Legal doctrines and principles